Bernard Edwards (born February 24, 1969) is a former American football player who played eight seasons in the Arena Football League with the Miami Hooters/Florida Bobcats and Tampa Bay Storm. He played college football at Ohio State University.

References

External links
Just Sports Stats

Living people
1969 births
Players of American football from Florida
American football wide receivers
American football linebackers
African-American players of American football
Ohio State Buckeyes football players
Miami Hooters players
Florida Bobcats players
Tampa Bay Storm players
Sportspeople from Fort Myers, Florida
21st-century African-American people
20th-century African-American sportspeople